Nityanand Mandke was an eminent and successful cardiac surgeon from Mumbai. He had carried out over 10,000 cardiac surgeries which is one of the records. A book named Hridayasth has been published. The book is based on Nityanand's career and it is high sold in Marathi and English.

Early life
Mandke was born on 31 January 1948. After graduating from B.J. Medical College, Pune, he came to Mumbai for his post graduation in General Surgery and Cardio-thoracic surgery, which he did from KEM Hospital, Mumbai under Dr. P. K. Sen.  After a short stint at the LTMC Hospital, Sion, Mumbai as an assistant professor. Mandke was boxing champion, captain of soccer team and a record holding distance runner, during his college days. He was adjudged the best all round student of Pune University during the year 1970.

Career
Mandke went to the United Kingdom and later to the United States and worked with Magdi Yacoub, Dr. Kirklin and Dr. Pacifico. Between 1979 and 1984, he worked at the University of Alabama and thereafter in Germany for some time. In 1985, he decided to come back to India and set up his own hospital that would specialise in treatment of cardiac illnesses.
He was consultant cardio-thoracic surgeon in Mumbai. He had treated several VIP patients, including Shiv Sena chief Bal Thackeray Mandke was a dextrous surgeon. He was equally at ease while operating upon a 6 month old blue baby as well as a 60-year-old man for coronary artery disease. He taught the finer technicalities of off-pump surgery to many students.

Mandke had established his dream hospital project in Andheri, Mumbai, It is now renamed the Kokilaben Dhirubhai Ambani Hospital. The poor patients will get treatment at affordable rates in this hospital.

Personal life
Nitu Mandke is married to Dr Alka Mandke who is the trustee of the Kokilaben Dhirubhai Ambani Hospital. They have two daughters Jui and Charuta who are also doctors and son Mandar who is in robotic engineering in the UK. Dr. Charuta is HOD & professor of ophthalmology at Hinduhridyaysamrat Balasaheb Thackeray Medical College & Dr R N Cooper Hospital, Juhu Mumbai  Dr. Charuta is helping people during this covid to get admitted in hospitals and find beds.

Death
Mandke was admitted to the Hinduja Hospital after a mild attack. He unfortunately died at the same Hospital at 2.30 pm on Thursday 22 May 2003  following a severe heart attack.

References

1948 births
2003 deaths
Indian cardiac surgeons
Medical doctors from Mumbai
20th-century Indian medical doctors
20th-century surgeons